There have been nine Popes named Boniface.

Pope Boniface I (r. 418–422)
Pope Boniface II (530–532)
Pope Boniface III (607)
Pope Boniface IV (608–615)
Pope Boniface V (619–625)
Pope Boniface VI (896)
Pope Boniface VII (984–985) (now listed as an antipope)
Pope Boniface VIII (1294–1303)
Pope Boniface IX (1389–1404)

Boniface